The electric power industry in Japan covers the generation, transmission, distribution, and sale of electric energy in Japan. Japan consumed 995.26 TWh of electricity in 2014.
Before the 2011 Fukushima Daiichi nuclear disaster, about a quarter of electricity in the country was generated by nuclear power.
In the following years, most nuclear power plants have been on hold, being replaced mostly by coal and natural gas.
Solar power is a growing source of electricity, and Japan has the third largest solar installed capacity with about 50 GW as of 2017.

Japan has the second largest pumped-hydro storage installed capacity in the world after China.

The electrical grid in Japan is isolated, with no international connections, and consists of four wide area synchronous grids. Unusually the Eastern and Western grids run at different frequencies (50 and 60 Hz respectively) and are connected by HVDC connections. This considerably limits the amount of electricity that can be transmitted between the north and south of the country.

At the behest of the Supreme Commander for the Allied Powers, Nippon Hassōden became the Electric Power Development Co., Limited in the fifties; and almost all of the electricity sector that are not under the control by EPDC was privatized into nine government-granted monopolies. The Ryukyu Islands electricity provider was, during the USCAR era, publicly owned; it was privatized shortly after the islands' admission into Japan.

Consumption 

In 2008, Japan consumed an average of 8507 kWh/person of electricity. That was 115% of the EU15 average of 7409 kWh/person and 95% of the OECD average of 8991 kWh/person.

Compared with other nations, electricity in Japan is relatively expensive.

Liberalization of the electricity market
Since the Fukushima Daiichi nuclear disaster, and the subsequent large scale shutdown on the nuclear power industry, Japan's ten regional electricity operators have been making very large financial losses, larger than US$15 billion in both 2012 and 2013.

Since then steps have been made to liberalize the electricity supply market. In April 2016 domestic and small business mains voltage customers became able to select from over 250 supplier companies competitively selling electricity, though many of these only sell locally mainly in large cities. Also wholesale electricity trading on the Japan Electric Power Exchange (JEPX), which previously only traded 1.5% of power generation, was encouraged. By June 2016 more than 1 million consumers had changed supplier. However total costs of liberalization to that point were around ¥80 billion, so it is unclear if consumers had benefited financially.

In 2020 transmission and distribution infrastructure access will be made more open, which will help competitive suppliers cut costs.

Transmission 

Electricity transmission in Japan is unusual because the country is divided for historical reasons into two regions each running at a different mains frequency. Eastern Japan has 50 Hz networks while western Japan has 60 Hz networks. Limitations of conversion capacity causes a bottleneck to transfer electricity and shift imbalances between the networks.

Eastern Japan (consisting of Hokkaido, Tohoku, Kanto, and eastern parts of Chubu) runs at 50 Hz; Western Japan (including most of Chubu, Kansai, Chugoku, Shikoku, and Kyushu) runs at 60 Hz. This originates from the first purchases of generators from AEG for Tokyo in 1895 and from General Electric for Osaka in 1896.

This frequency difference partitions Japan's national grid, so that power can only be moved between the two parts of the grid using frequency converters, or HVDC transmission lines.  The boundary between the two regions contains four back-to-back HVDC substations which convert the frequency; these are Shin Shinano, Sakuma Dam, Minami-Fukumitsu, and the Higashi-Shimizu Frequency Converter. The total transmission capacity between the two grids is 1.2 GW.

The limitations of these links have been a major problem in providing power to the areas of Japan affected by the Fukushima Daiichi nuclear disaster. During the 2011 Tōhoku earthquake and tsunami, there were blackouts in some areas of the country due to insufficient ability of the 3 HVDC converter stations to transfer energy between the 2 networks.

A few projects are underway to increase the electricity transfer between the 50 Hz (eastern Japan) and 60 Hz networks (western Japan) which will improve power reliability in Japan. In April 2019, Hitachi ABB HVDC Technologies secured an HVDC order for the Higashi Shimizu project to increase the interconnection capacity between the 60Hz area of Chubu Electric and the 50Hz area of TEPCO from 1.2GW to 3GW. Chubu Electric will increase the interconnection capacity of the Higashi Shimizu Substation from 300MW to 900MW which should be operational by 2027. OCCTO (Organization for Cross-regional Coordination of Transmission Operators) supervises the power interchange among electric power companies.

Mode of production 

According to the International Energy Agency, Japanese gross production of electricity was 1,041 TWh in 2009, making it the world's third largest producer of electricity with 5.2% of the world's electricity. After Fukushima, Japan imported an additional 10 million short tons of coal and liquefied natural gas imports rose 24% between 2010 and 2012. In 2012 Japan used most of its natural gas (64%) in the power sector.

Nuclear power

Nuclear power was a national strategic priority in Japan. Following the 2011 Fukushima nuclear accidents, the national nuclear strategy is in doubt due to increasing public opposition to nuclear power. An energy white paper, approved by the Japanese Cabinet in October 2011, reported that "public confidence in safety of nuclear power was greatly damaged" by the Fukushima disaster, and it calls for a reduction in the nation's reliance on nuclear power.

Following the 2011 accident, many reactors were shut down for inspection and for upgrades to more stringent safety standards. By October 2011, only 11 nuclear power plants were operating in Japan, and all 50 nuclear reactors were offline by 15 September 2013, leaving Japan without nuclear energy for only the second time in almost 50 years. Carbon dioxide emissions from the electricity industry rose in 2012, reaching levels 39% more than when the reactors were in operation.

Sendai 1 reactor was restarted on 11 August 2015, the first reactor to meet new safety standards and be restarted after the shutdown. As of July 2018, there are nine reactors that have been restarted.

Hydro power

Hydroelectricity is Japan's main renewable energy source, with an installed capacity of about 27 GW, or 16% of the total generation capacity, of which about half is pumped-storage. The production was 73 TWh in 2010.
As of September 2011, Japan had 1,198 small hydropower plants with a total capacity of 3,225 MW. The smaller plants accounted for 6.6 percent of Japan's total hydropower capacity. The remaining capacity was filled by large and medium hydropower stations, typically sited at large dams.

Other renewables

The Japanese government announced in May 2011 a goal of producing 20% of the nation's electricity from renewable sources, including solar, wind, and biomass, by the early 2020s.

Citing the Fukushima nuclear disaster, environmental activists at a United Nations conference urged bolder steps to tap renewable energy so the world doesn't have to choose between the dangers of nuclear power and the ravages of climate change.

Benjamin K. Sovacool has said that, with the benefit of hindsight, the Fukushima disaster was entirely avoidable in that Japan could have chosen to exploit the country's extensive renewable energy base. Japan has a total of "324 GW of achievable potential in the form of onshore and offshore wind turbines | 222 GW| , geothermal power plants | 70  GW| , additional hydroelectric capacity | 26.5 GW| , solar energy | 4.8 GW|  and agricultural residue | 1.1 GW| ."

One result of the Fukushima Daiichi nuclear disaster could be renewed public support for the commercialization of renewable energy technologies. In August 2011, the Japanese Government passed a bill to subsidize electricity from renewable energy sources. The legislation will become effective on 1 July 2012, and require utilities to buy electricity generated by renewable sources including solar power, wind power and geothermal energy at above-market rates.

, Japan plans to build a pilot floating wind farm, with six 2-megawatt turbines, off the Fukushima coast. After the evaluation phase is complete in 2016, "Japan plans to build as many as 80 floating wind turbines off Fukushima by 2020."

Power stations

Grid storage
Japan relies mostly on pumped storage hydroelectricity to balance demand and supply. As of 2014, Japan has the largest pumped storage capacity in the world, with over 27 GW.

See also

Japan Electric Association
Energy in Japan

References

 

de:Stromerzeugung in Japan
ja:日本の電力会社